Attention economics is an approach to the management of information that treats human attention as a scarce commodity and applies economic theory to solve various information management problems. According to Matthew Crawford, "Attention is a resource—a person has only so much of it."

In this perspective, Thomas H. Davenport and John C. Beck define the concept of attention:
Attention is focused mental engagement on a particular item of information. Items come into our awareness, we attend to a particular item, and then we decide whether to act.

As content has grown increasingly abundant and immediately available, attention becomes the limiting factor in the consumption of information.
A strong trigger of this effect is that it limits the mental capability of humans and the receptiveness of information is also limited. Attention allows information to be filtered such that the most important information can be extracted from the environment while irrelevant details can be left out.

Software applications either explicitly or implicitly take attention economy into consideration in their user interface design based on the realization that if it takes the user too long to locate something, they will find it through another application. This is done, for instance, by creating filters to make sure viewers are presented with information that is most relevant, of interest, and personalized based on past web search history.

Theory
Research from a wide range of disciplines including psychology, cognitive science, neuroscience, and economics, suggest that humans have limited cognitive resources that can be used at any given time, when resources are allocated to one task, the resources available for other tasks will be limited. Given that attention is a cognitive process that involves the selective concentration of resources on a given item of information, to the exclusion of other perceivable information, attention can be considered in terms of limited processing resources.

History
The concept of attention economics was first theorized by psychologist and economist Herbert A. Simon when he wrote about the scarcity of attention in an information-rich world:

[I]n an information-rich world, the wealth of information means a dearth of something else: a scarcity of whatever it is that information consumes. What information consumes is rather obvious: it consumes the attention of its recipients. Hence a wealth of information creates a poverty of attention and a need to allocate that attention efficiently among the overabundance of information sources that might consume it.

He noted that many designers of information systems incorrectly represented their design problem as information scarcity rather than attention scarcity, and as a result, they built systems that excelled at providing more and more information to people, when what was really needed were systems that excelled at filtering out unimportant or irrelevant information.

Simon's characterization of the problem of information overload as an economic one has become increasingly popular in analyzing information consumption since the mid-1990s, when writers such as Thomas H. Davenport and Michael Goldhaber adopted terms like "attention economy" and "economics of attention".

Some writers have speculated that "attention transactions" will replace financial transactions as the focus of our economic system. Information systems researchers have also adopted the idea, and are beginning to investigate mechanism designs which build on the idea of creating property rights in attention (see Applications).

Intangibles
According to digital culture expert Kevin Kelly, the modern attention economy is increasingly one where the consumer product costs virtually nothing to reproduce and the problem facing the supplier of the product lies in adding valuable intangibles that cannot be reproduced at any cost. He identifies these intangibles as:
Immediacy - priority access, immediate delivery
Personalization - tailored just for you
Interpretation - support and guidance
Authenticity - how can you be sure it is the real thing?
Accessibility - wherever, whenever
Embodiment - books, live music
Patronage - "paying simply because it feels good"
Findability - "When there are millions of books, millions of songs, millions of films, millions of applications, millions of everything requesting our attention—and most of it free—being found is valuable."

Social attention, collective attention
Attention economics is also relevant to the social sphere. Specifically, long-term attention can be considered according to the attention that a person dedicates to managing their interactions with others. Dedicating too much attention to these interactions can lead to "social interaction overload", i.e. when people are overwhelmed in managing their relationships with others, for instance in the context of social network services in which people are the subject of a high level of social solicitations. Digital media and the internet facilitate participation in this economy by creating new channels for distributing attention. Ordinary people are now empowered to reach a wide audience by publishing their own content and commenting on the content of others.

Social attention can also be associated to collective attention, i.e. how "attention to novel items propagates and eventually fades among large populations".

Applications

In advertising

"Attention economics" treats a potential consumer's attention as a resource. Traditional media advertisers followed a model that suggested consumers went through a linear process they called AIDA - Attention, Interest, Desire and Action. Attention is therefore a major and the first stage in the process of converting non-consumers. Since the cost to transmit advertising to consumers has become sufficiently low given that more ads can be transmitted to a consumer (e.g. via online advertising) than the consumer can process, the consumer's attention becomes the scarce resource to be allocated. As such, a superfluidity of information may hinder an individual's decision-making who keeps searching and comparing products as long as it promises to provide more than it is using up.

Advertisers that produce attention-grabbing content that is presented to unconsenting consumers without compensation have been criticized for perpetrating attention theft.

Controlling information pollution

One application treats various forms of information (e.g. spam, advertising) as a form of pollution or 'detrimental externality'. In economics, an externality is a by-product of a production process that imposes burdens (or supplies benefits), to parties other than the intended consumer of a commodity. For example; air and water pollution are ‘negative’ externalities that impose burdens on society and the environment.

A market-based approach to controlling externalities was outlined in Ronald Coase's The Problem of Social Cost (1960). This evolved from an article on the Federal Communications Commission (1959), in which Coase claimed that radio frequency interference is a negative externality that could be controlled by the creation of property rights.

Coase's approach to the management of externalities requires the careful specification of property rights and a set of rules for the initial allocation of the rights. Once this has been achieved, a market mechanism can theoretically manage the externality problem.

E-mail spam
Sending huge numbers of e-mail messages costs spammers very little, since the costs of e-mail messages are spread out over the internet service providers that distribute them (and the recipients who must spend attention dealing with them). Thus sending out as much spam as possible is a rational strategy: even if only 0.001% of recipients (1 in 100,000) is converted into a sale, a spam campaign can be profitable. Of course, it is very difficult to understand where all the revenue comes from since these businesses are run through proxy servers. However, if they were not profitable, it is reasonable to conclude that they would not be sending spam. Spammers are demanding valuable attention from potential customers, but avoid paying a fair price for this attention due to the current architecture of e-mail systems.

One way this might be mitigated is through the implementation of "Sender Bond" whereby senders are required to post a financial bond that is forfeited if enough recipients report an email as spam.

Closely related is the idea of selling "interrupt rights", or small fees for the right to demand one's attention. The cost of these rights could vary according to the person who is interrupted: interrupt rights for the CEO of a Fortune 500 company would presumably be extraordinarily expensive, while those of a high school student might be lower. Costs could also vary for an individual depending on context, perhaps rising during the busy holiday season and falling during the dog days of summer. Those who are interrupted could decline to collect their fees from friends, family, and other welcome interrupters.

Another idea in this vein is the creation of "attention bonds", small warranties that some information will not be a waste of the recipient's time, placed into escrow at the time of sending. Like the granters of interrupt rights, receivers could cash in their bonds to signal to the sender that a given communication was a waste of their time or elect not to cash them in to signal that more communication would be welcome.

Web spam
As search engines have become a primary means for finding and accessing information on the web, high rankings in the results for certain queries have become valuable commodities, due to the ability of search engines to focus searchers' attention. Like other information systems, web search is vulnerable to pollution: "Because the Web environment contains profit seeking ventures, attention getting strategies evolve in response to search engine algorithms".

Since most major search engines now rely on some form of PageRank (recursive counting of hyperlinks to a site) to determine search result rankings, a gray market in the creation and trading of hyperlinks has emerged. Participants in this market engage in a variety of practices known as link spamming, link farming, and reciprocal linking.

Another issue, similar to the issue discussed above of whether or not to consider political e-mail campaigns as spam, is what to do about politically motivated link campaigns or Google bombs. Currently, the major search engines do not treat these as web spam, but this is a decision made unilaterally by private companies.

Sales lead generation

The paid inclusion model, as well as more pervasive advertising networks like Yahoo! Publisher Network and Google's AdSense, work by treating consumer attention as the property of the search engine (in the case of paid inclusion) or the publisher (in the case of advertising networks). This is somewhat different from the anti-spam uses of property rights in attention, which treat an individual's attention as his or her own property.

See also
 Attention (disambiguation)
 Attention inequality
 Attention management
 Center for Humane Technology
 Clickbait
 Cognitive Surplus
 Continuous partial attention
 Fearmongering
 Imagination age
 Information explosion
 Information society
 Mediatization
 Netocracy
 Piotr Woźniak
 Post-scarcity economy
 The Magical Number Seven, Plus or Minus Two (paper)
 Tim Ferriss, low information diet

References

Further reading

.

External links
 Video podcast on the Attention Economy
 The Ingenesist Project - The Next Economic Paradigm

Attention
Economic sociology
Information Age
Economy by field